Andrew Smith (born 25 May 1966 in York, England) is a retired motorcycle speedway rider from England.

Career

Smith spent the first seven years of his career riding for the Belle Vue Aces from 1982 to 1988. He then joined Bradford Dukes for two British League seasons and began to build a reputation as one of Britain's leading riders. Smith also rode in Australia, including the 1990/91 Australian season when he based himself at Claremont Speedway in Perth, Western Australia. Despite Claremont being almost twice the length of most British tracks, on 18 January 1991 Smith defeated home town hero, and twice Australian Champion Glenn Doyle in the King of Claremont Classic. Smith also finished 2nd to Sweden's Dennis Löfqvist at the 1990 Boxing Day International at the Melbourne Showgrounds.

After joining the Coventry Bees in 1992 he went on to win the British Speedway Championship three times in a row in 1993, 1994, and 1995, giving him the distinction of being one of only three riders ever to achieve this feat.

From 1998 until 2001 Smith rode a second stint at Belle Vue and recorded a 8.27 average during the 1999 Elite League speedway season. He did not ride in the United Kingdom for the 2002 season, spending his time in Poland.

In 2003, he returned to the UK and signed for Oxford (known as the Silver Machine at the time) for the 2003 Elite League speedway season. He then rode for Swindon Robins in 2004 before returning to his first club Belle Vue for the 2005 Elite League speedway season, where he helped the club win the Elite League Knockout Cup.

He would spend 16 seasons racing in the Polish leagues after making his Polish league debut in 1992. He also continued to ride for various clubs in England until the end of the 2007 seasons.

During his career Smith reached two World finals and rode in the Speedway Grand Prix for eight years. He represented Great Britain and his appearances included a Speedway World Cup, which was the 1999 Speedway World Team Cup.

World Final Appearances

Individual World Championship
 1989 -  Munich, Olympic Stadium - 7th - 10pts
 1993 -  Pocking, Rottalstadion - 5th - 10pts

World Team Cup
 1999 -  Pardubice, Svítkova Stadion (with Chris Louis / Carl Stonehewer / Joe Screen / Mark Loram) - 4th - 29pts (0)

Speedway Grand Prix results

See also 
 List of Speedway Grand Prix riders

World Longtrack Championship

Finals

1991 -  Marianske Lazne 10pts (8th)

1992 -  Pfarrkirchen 5pts (12th)

References

British speedway riders
British Speedway Championship winners
1966 births
Living people
Polonia Bydgoszcz riders
Belle Vue Aces riders
Bradford Dukes riders
Coventry Bees riders
Oxford Cheetahs riders
Reading Racers riders
Swindon Robins riders
English expatriate sportspeople in Poland
Expatriate speedway riders in Poland
Naturalized citizens of Poland